The Internal Military Service, (WSW)  Szefostwo, was an armed  military counterintelligence, military police, and military secret police within the structure of Ministry of National Defense or (MON).  It served and protected  the Polish Armed Forces against western  and central MON institutions  during the years of 1957-1990 in the Polish People's Republic or PRL.

History of Polish counterintelligence after World War II

Background 
When Polish communists with the consent of Joseph Stalin start to create a Polish military units in Soviet Union. First unit was formed on 14 May 1943, it was Polish 1st Tadeusz Kosciuszko Infantry Division.

A day later, on May 15, 1943 at the division headquarters by the Soviets so-called the Military Information (IW), which was responsible for the political security and counterintelligence in the division. First it was 20 people they were Russians, whom came from soviet formation like SMERSH, NKGB and NKVD. These people will direct the Polish counterintelligence until 1957. People like Colonel Dmitry Wozniesienski, a former officer of SMERSH, Col. Kożuszko Red Army officer, and many others. In 1943–1944, 100% of positions were filled at the IW by Soviet officers. The first group of Poles rushed in mid-1944—there were probably 17, but took up the position of interpreters and other not significant positions.

Should also pay attention to the ethnic origin of the officers who have spanned executive positions. Same thing was in civilian security service the Ministry of Public Security. When slowly Soviet officers were going away, freeing up space for the officers, "Polish", which is a very relative concept because of their origin. For example, in August 1945, at Deputy of the Head of Main Directorate of Information of the Polish Army, Officers were called "Polish": Col. Anatoly (Natan) and Colonel Eugene Feygin Zadrzyński (both Jewish).

In December 1945, Colonel Peter Kożuszko was recalled to the Soviet Union, and was replaced by Col. Jan Rutkowski (pre-war communist of Jewish origin.) Also, his successor, Colonel Stefan Kuhl, was of Jewish origin, as well as the heads of four of the five departments (sections). And so:

Section I: counterintelligence protection of the Army Staffs led by Col. Alexander Kokoshin.
Section II: elimination of enemy spies, work control and Instructors led by Col. Ignatius Flint.
Section  III: counterintelligence operation targeting led by Col. Jerzy Fonkowicz, he had very close contacts with high-ranking Smersh officers, the NKVD foreign intelligence service, and also the soviet Military Intelligence the GRU, but he was nor conformed as an agent.
Section  IV: Investigations, led by Col. Wladyslaw Kochan.
Section  V: Operations - observation, searches, arrests, led by Colonel Vincent Klupiński.

With only the aforementioned Colonel Kochan was of Polish origin.

The actions of so-called military information, additionally the tasks for which it was established that is, military counterintelligence, it rely consisted more on the fight against the opponents of the communist regime in the Polish Army. IW chased prewar officers, officers and soldiers of the Home Army, and other key independent organizations. Organizations that were loyal and subject to the orders of the Polish government on exile in London.

Starting from mid 1944–1945 IW carried out purges in the army, with apply proven soviet methods, like arrests, torture and show trials. With these actions, IW was even more cruel than the Gestapo, Nazi political police.

After 1956 and under the new political conditions in Poland, the existing military counterintelligence which in 1956 was The Main Directorate of Information with in  Ministry of National Defence (Główny Zarząd Informacji Ministerstwa Obrony Narodowej),  was dismantled in January 1957.

Creation of WSW 
The WSW (Wojskowa Służba Wewnętrzna), the Internal Military Service was established in order number 01/1957 by the Minister of National Defense, a position occupied then by General (from 1963 Marshal of Poland) Marian Spychalski, a soldier and communist politician. He was born in 1906 and was a communist during the World War II, a high-ranking officer active in the communist resistance in Poland. He was later appointed the chief of General Staff of the People's Guard, which after a reorganization during the second half of 1944 became one of the main departments in the People's Army.

Also the order of Chief of General Staff of the People's Army of Poland a position occupied then by Soviet officer General Jerzy Bordziłowski, also Deputy Defence Minister. His order No. 0013 allow to disband the Main Directorate of Information of the Polish Army so-called Informacja Wojskowa (Military Information).

The name indicates that this was a Military Intelligence formation, a lot of people are still convinced that it was. But is not truth. As the main article Main Directorate of Information of the Polish Army indicates that it was counterintelligence and political police formation.

Responsibilities and supervision 

WSW was responsible for typical military counterintelligence and military police duties. They were:

Detection of espionage activity in Polish People's Army.
Elimination of detected espionage activity.
Detection of Political sabotage in Polish People's Army.
Elimination of detected Political sabotage.
Detection of Polish People's Army soldiers who carry out terrorist attacks.
Detection of officers and soldiers who carry out sabotage in units of Polish People's Army.
Elimination of these two threats.
Detection and elimination created by the soldiers and officers of illegal political alliances in the Polish People's Army.
Counterintelligence Supervision of the Polish Navy.
Counterintelligence Supervision of Air Force and Air Defence of the Country.
Protection of Minister of National Defence and the closest family.
Counterintelligence Supervision of factories working for the Ministry Of National Defense, such as the production of tanks and other weapons for the needs of the Army, Navy, Air Force etc.
Maintaining discipline in the Polish People's Army.
Conducting investigation of criminal cases in which suspects were officers or soldiers of the Polish People's Army.
Conducting prosecutions of soldiers who deserted or did not return from a pass (home live).
Overseeing the recruitment of Polish People's Army.

The Military Internal Service was not part of the General Staff. Operating separately from the General Staff the Military Internal Service (WSW) had a larger field for maneuvers. WSW/MIS was a part of the Ministry of National Defence as one of its departments. Exact name of that department was - Szefostwo Wojskowej Służby Wewnętrznej which meant Central Command Authority of the Military Internal Service.

As a part of Ministry of National Defence of the Republic of Poland (MON), Military Internal Service was monitored and subject to the orders of one of the vice ministers of National Defence, or to the first Deputy (vice minister) of Minister of National Defence.

WSW Chiefs 

The first head of WSW was born in 1903, Colonel and later General Aleksander Kokoszyn, a Belarusian. Pre-war communist and graduate of NKVD school in Smolensk. During the war years was working in secret Polish Workers' Party paper and copy shop (Gwardzisty), were in 1942 was arrested by Gestapo and send to one of the concentration camps.

After the war he returned to Poland and began working together with his wife in the notorious GZI WP the military counterintelligence, were in December 1956 he became the head of GZI and then the Chief of Military Internal Servise. Doing his time as an Internal Military Service head, the WSW had lost the look as effective and notorious counterintelligence service as the Main Directorate of Information of the Polish Army GZI was. Kokoszyn left his position in November 1964 and was replaced by his former deputy General Teodor Kufel, who start as an acting WSW Chief.

Teodor Kufel born in 1920, later in 1954 the graduate of KGB school in Moscow. From beginning he was involved in secret service activities. Doing the war he was involved in Warsaw Uprising. Then after the war he was working in Police (Milicja or MO), and from 1953 for the civilian Special Services the Ministry of Public Security (MBP). Between 1954 and 1955 Kufel attend KGB school in Moscow and after his come back start working in Militsiya General Headquarters in Warsaw. Three years later Kufel was moved to military counterintelligence, Internal Military Service, as a deputy head of first Directorate responsible for counterintelligence, and in 1964 he became WSW Chief and held this post for 14 years till 1979 when General Czesław Kiszczak become his successor.

Born in 1925 Czesław Kiszczak was long time military counterintelligence officer, first working in Main Directorate of Information of the Polish Army (GZI), to become head of counterintelligence for one of the infantry divisions and then one of the Military District and later head of counterintelligence for the Polish Navy. In 1967 Kiszczak become Kufel's deputy. But three years later he became the head of military intelligence which was then Zarząd II Sztabu Generalnego Wojska Polskiego (2nd Directorate of General Staff of the Polish Army). After seven years as an it head, in 1979 Kiszczak come back to WSW to take over after Kufel. Again he was moved in 1981, this time to the civilian branches of secret service, he became minister and took over the Ministry of Internal Affairs (Ministerstwo Spraw Wewnętrznych) or MSW, witch this position Kiszczak had the notorious Służba Bezpieczeństwa (SB) under his control. After General Kiszczak left WSW he was replace witch General Edward Poradko.

Born in 1924 Poradko had almost the same military past as Kiszczak. After the war he joint the military counterintelligence and was working for long time in the GZI. Then was moved military intelligence and took over the strategic intelligence. In 1981 after Kiszczak left the WSW he come back to take over as a head. The next and last head of WSW was General Edmund Buła.

There are speculations that gen. Edmund Buła had ordered to copy lists of WSW Informants and agents and sent it to Moscow, to KGB's Third Main Directorate, and some of them to GRU. Buła is also responsible for many other things. In the 1980s, the Military Internal Service was very much involved in the fight against the democratic opposition Solidarity, etc. Almost all of the operational documents from those years have been burned, (in 1988 11 tons and latter another 5) all of this actions were controlled by general Bula and supervised by Colonel Mieczysław Kacprzyk. But the order to destroy of these documents, had to come from a higher level, it came from General's W. Jaruzelski and Czesław Kiszczak. From 1957 to 1990 the commanders of WSW were:

Gen. Aleksander Kokoszyn - 01/10/1957 – 11/14/1964
Gen. Teodor Kufel - (act) 11/14/1964 –  06/24/1965
gen. Teodor Kufel - 06/24/1965–1979
Gen. Czesław Kiszczak - 1979–1981
Gen. Edward Poradko - 1981–1986
Gen. Edmund Buła - 08/15/1986 – 08/1990

Mazur Commission and WSW activities 
The WSW was much different from its predecessor. During the transition from the Military Information to Military Internal Service, a special commission was established, so-called Mazur Commission. Its task was to check the activities of former Military Information, and an indication of the officers who showed cruelty to detainees doing the investigations. 
The results of the commission have been classified and have been hidden from the general public till 1999, when one of the major newspapers (Gazeta Wyborcza) had printed pieces of it.

Organization 
During the beginning Internal Military Service was based on two main wings: first was operational counterintelligence, and second for investigation and safety tasks. The each wing were supervised by WSW Chef Deputies. Deatel WSW organization was:

First Directorate - military counterintelligence responsible for counter-espionage protection of the army's structure and its units and important military infrastructure and installations. First Directorate consisted of four sections.

1st Section: protection of military secrets, confidentiality and prevention
2nd Section: Offensive counterintelligence, carrying out recruitment of secret informants in the ranks of Polish Army, Navy, and Air Force. Also conducting so-called operational counterintelligence games.
3rd Section: Elimination of political sabotage in military units.
4 Section: counterintelligence analysis.

Second Directorate - Responsible for keeping an eye on order and discipline in the army units. Also the second main responsibility of 2nd Directorate was: Carrying out investigation cases, criminal, and the various offenses committed by soldiers of the armed forces. 2nd Directorate consisted of four Sections and one special section.

Bibliography/sources 
Leszek Pawlikowicz - Tajny Front Zimnej wojny: Uciekinierzy z polskich służb specjalnych 1956–1964, oficyna wydawnicza Rytm 2004, Leszek Pawlikowicz - Secret Front of the Cold War: Defectors from the Polish special services 1956–1964, a publishing house Rhythm 2004
Jerzy Pokosiński – Represje wobec oficerów Wojska Polskiego 1949–1956 (TUN), Bellona Warszawa 1992–2007.
Henryk Piecuch – Akcje Specjalne: Od Bieruta do Ochaba, Agencja Wydawnicza CB Warszawa 1996.

Defunct Polish intelligence agencies
1957 establishments in Poland
Military police of Poland
Military provosts of Poland
Military intelligence agencies